Alexander F. Donoghue (1863–1931) was a Major League Baseball player. He played outfielder and shortstop for the 1891 Philadelphia Phillies of the National League. He played in the minor leagues from 1886 through 1896.

External links

1863 births
1931 deaths
Major League Baseball outfielders
Major League Baseball shortstops
Philadelphia Phillies players
19th-century baseball players
Baseball players from Pennsylvania
Altoona Mountain Cities players
Canton Nadjys players
Washington Senators (minor league) players
Altoona Mountaineers players
Lebanon Cedars players
Atlanta Firecrackers players
St. Paul Saints (Western League) players
Altoona Mud Turtles players
Lancaster Chicks players
Allentown Goobers players
New Haven Texas Steers players
Hanover Tigers players
Bridgeton (minor league baseball) players